Matheus Oliveira may refer to:

 Matheus Oliveira (footballer, born 1996), Brazilian football defender
 Matheus Oliveira (footballer, born 1997), Brazilian football attacking midfielder

See also
 Mateus Oliveira (disambiguation)